Damian Davey (born Damian Gerard Baker; 30 September 1964 – 12 February 2017), better known by the mononym Damian, was an English pop musician, best known for his 1989 hit "The Time Warp", a cover version of the original track from The Rocky Horror Show.

Career
Damian was briefly successful in the late 1980s. His first version of "The Time Warp", released in 1987, was produced by Des Tong from Sad Café and featured Sheila Gott, Jean Barrow, Ian Wilson and Steve Butler on backing vocals. It was recorded at Vector TV in Stockport and mixed at Battery Studios, London by Paul Schroeder.

Both this and a 1988 reissue of the song failed to make the Top 40 of the UK Singles Chart, and it only became a major hit after being remixed and restructured by Pete Hammond, reaching number 7 in the same chart in 1989.

Damian's follow up single, "Wig-Wam Bam", a cover of The Sweet song, reached number 49 in the UK Singles Chart.

Personal life and death
Damian died on 12 February 2017, aged 52, following a three-year battle against cancer.

Discography

Singles

References

1964 births
2017 deaths
English male singers
English pop singers
Place of death missing
Musicians from Manchester
Deaths from cancer in the United Kingdom